Central City High School may refer to:

Central City High School (Iowa) in Central City, Iowa
Central City High School (Kentucky), in Central City, Kentucky (now closed)
Central City High School (Nebraska) in Central City, Nebraska